Frine, Courtesan of Orient is a 1953 Italian epic adventure film directed by Mario Bonnard and starring Elena Kleus and Pierre Cressoy. Sergio Leone served as assistant director.

Plot

Cast
Elena Kleus: Frine
Pierre Cressoy: Iperide
Tamara Lees: Criside
Giulio Donnini: Lamaco
Roldano Lupi: Prassitele
John Kitzmiller: Nabus
Lamberto Picasso: Titteca
Barbara Berg: Ate
Franco Silva: Claus
José Jaspe: Crosio
Carlo Tamberlani: Assirione
Nico Pepe: Dignitary
Gian Paolo Rosmino: Taulete
Charles Fawcett: King Arconte
Mino Doro: Osco
Vittorio Duse: Official
Edda Soligo: Cleo
Enzo Biliotti: Macio
Bruna Corrà: Telesilla
Lilia Landi: Diala
Cesare Fantoni: Prosecutor
Mariolina Bovo: First Slave
Fanny Landini: Second Slave
Franca Tamantini: Frine's Slave
Luisella Boni: Touni
Luigi Pavese: Warrior

References

External links

1950s historical adventure films
Italian historical adventure films
Films directed by Mario Bonnard
1953 films
1950s Italian-language films
Italian black-and-white films
1950s Italian films